2 Gentlemen in Verona is a 2000 live album of improvised experimental music by Chris Cutler and Fred Frith. It was recorded Verona, Italy on 16 April 1999 and released by Recommended Records in April 2000. It was Frith and Cutler's third collaborative album.

The album title was derived from Shakespeare's play The Two Gentlemen of Verona, and the track names were taken from the play's act and scene titles.

Reception

In a review of 2 Gentlemen in Verona at AllMusic, Thom Jurek described Cutler and Frith's performance as "a joyously brash and boisterous cacophony", and labelled the album "one of the greatest live duet improv recordings ever". Writing in All About Jazz, Glenn Astarita called Cutler and Frith's set in Verona a "fascinating live exhibition" of "multi-textured pastiches ... abstract rhythms, otherworldly effects and mind-bending dialogue". Astarita rated the album "Highly recommended".

Reviewing the album in The Wire, Philip Clark described 2 Gentlemen in Verona as a "feral modern classic". He said Frith's "massed sonorities and simple singsong patterns" are accompanied by the "noisy, byzantine complexity" of Cutler's drums that from time to time settle down to "stretchy rock beats and rigid marching patterns".

In The Washington Post Mike Joyce described the album as a "curious and quixotic excursion into freely improvised music", adding that despite the "odd sounds and surprising tangents", the duo remains on a "common wavelength, anticipating each other's moods and moves with quick speed and wit". Joyce wrote that anyone who has followed the career of Cutler and Frith will welcome this recording, but warned that the uninitiated may find it "unendurably indulgent".

David Ashcraft was more critical of the album. In a review in Exposé he wrote that this recording is "strictly for the hardcore fan of improvised exploration". He said that while it "showcases the improvisational talents" of Cutler and Frith, it is not without "hits and misses". Ashcraft felt that between "sublime moments of melody and emotion", there is "plenty of meandering and some dissonant sounds".

Track listing
All music by Chris Cutler and Fred Frith.

Sources: Liner notes, Discogs, Fred Frith discography.

Personnel
Chris Cutler – drums, electrified drums, flotsam
Fred Frith – electrified guitars, voice, jetsam

Sources: Liner notes, Discogs, Fred Frith discography.

Sound and artwork
Concert recorded and photographed by Sergio Amadori
Edited and mastered by Chris Cutler at Wolf Studios, London, and Studio Midi-Pyrénées, La Borde Basse, Caudeval, France
Engineered by Dominique Brethes at Wolf Studios
Engineered by Bob Drake at Studio Midi-Pyrénées
CD cover and booklet design by Gregg Skerman

Sources: Liner notes, Discogs, Fred Frith discography.

Notes

References

2000 live albums
Collaborative albums
Experimental music albums by English artists
Live free improvisation albums
Fred Frith live albums
Chris Cutler live albums
Recommended Records live albums